Sefid Ab (also Romanized as Sefīd Āb and Safīd Āb) is a village in Kuh Panah Rural District, in the Central District of Tafresh County, Markazi Province, Iran. At the 2006 census, its population was 143, in 49 families.

References 

Populated places in Tafresh County